Veliky Vrag is a rural locality (a selo) in Kstovsky District of Nizhny Novgorod Oblast, Russia, located on the high southern bank of the Volga River just northeast of the town of Kstovo.

Local historical sites include the Church of Our Lady of Kazan. It was built in 1792 and is now protected as a heritage site, owned by the federal government.

References

Rural localities in Nizhny Novgorod Oblast
Kstovsky District